The Pittsburgh Pirates are a professional baseball team based in Pittsburgh, Pennsylvania. They compete in the Central Division of Major League Baseball's (MLB) National League (NL). Founded in 1882 as Allegheny, the club played in the American Association before moving to the National League in 1887. The list below documents players and teams that hold particular club records.

In 134 seasons from 1882 through 2015, the team has won over 10,000 games and five World Series championships. The team has appeared in 18 postseasons and has won nine league pennants. Roberto Clemente owns the most career batting records with five. Ralph Kiner, Arky Vaughan and Paul Waner each own three single-season batting records. Bob Friend owns the most career pitching records and Ed Morris the most single-season pitching records, both with six.

In their history, the Pittsburgh Pirates have set three Major League Baseball records. In 1912, Chief Wilson hit an MLB-record 36 triples and, on May 30, 1925, the team collectively hit a major league-record eight triples in a single game. In addition, six no-hitters have been thrown in the history of the franchise, with the most recent on July 12, 1997. The Pirates also hold the MLB—and North American professional sports—record for most consecutive losing seasons with 20. The stretch began with the 1993 season and concluded with the 2012 season, at which point the Pirates recorded a winning record and a playoff berth in the 2013 season.

Table key

Statistics are current through the 2015 season.

Individual career records
These are records of players with the best performance in particular statistical categories during their tenure with the Pirates.

Career batting

Career pitching

Individual single-season records
These are records of Pirates players with the best performance in particular statistical categories during a single season.

Single-season batting

Single-season pitching

Team single-game records

These are records of Pirates teams with the best performance in particular statistical categories during a single game.

Single-game batting

Single-game pitching

Team season records

These are records of Pirates teams with the best and worst performances in particular statistical categories during a single season.

Season batting

Season pitching

Team all-time records
Source:

See also
Baseball statistics
Pittsburgh Pirates award winners and league leaders
History of the Pittsburgh Pirates

Notes

References

Major League Baseball team records
Records